Lago Pio is a lake, south of the village Villalago in the Province of L'Aquila, Abruzzo, Italy.

Reference 

Lakes of Abruzzo